A by-election was held for the New South Wales Legislative Assembly electorate of Willoughby on 16 September 1915 following the death of Edward Larkin who was killed in action at Gallipoli.

Dates

Candidates
The Liberal Reform Party chose not to nominate a candidate and Charles Wade, the Leader of the Opposition, encouraged Liberals not to vote in the election, stating "it would be almost indecent to launch a fierce party contest over the
grave of a man who had given his life on behalf of all parties." Opposition to the Labor candidate was a source of controversy between Wade and the Premier, William Holman. 
John Chambers was the selected Labor candidate and an official of the Tramway union.
Edward Clark had represented Labor, Free Trade and Liberal Reform for St Leonards and Willoughby, before becoming an independent and member of the Single Tax League since 1907. He was also an alderman of the North Sydney Council.
John Haynes had been defeated for pre-selection as the Liberal Reform candidate for the 1913 election and the Liberal Reform party was accused of providing covert support for him.
Thomas Redgrave was an alderman of Willoughby Council and was described by The Daily Telegraph as an independent labor.
 Michael Roland was a baker from Newtown.
John Wilson was the general secretary of the Post and Telegraph officers association and was described by The Daily Telegraph as an independent liberal.

Result

A second ballot was necessary because no candidate had won an absolute majority.

Edward Larkin was killed in action at Gallipoli.

See also
Electoral results for the district of Willoughby
List of New South Wales state by-elections

References

1915 elections in Australia
New South Wales state by-elections
1910s in New South Wales